Muir of Ord Rovers Football Club are a football team from Muir of Ord in the Highlands of Scotland. 
They competed in the North Caledonian Football League until 2014 and played their home matches at Pavilion Park. 

The club is still active today, playing in the Inverness and District Amateur League.

References

Former North Caledonian Football League teams
Football clubs in Scotland
Football in Highland (council area)
Black Isle